Our Beloved Revolutionary Sweetheart is a 1988 album by Camper Van Beethoven, released on Virgin Records.  It was the band's first major-label album, and was produced by Dennis Herring, the first time the band had used an outside producer.

The lineup on the album included David Lowery on lead vocals and rhythm guitar, Jonathan Segel on violin, mandolin, keyboards, guitar and backing vocals, Victor Krummenacher on bass and backing vocals, Greg Lisher on lead guitar, and Chris Pedersen on drums.  It was the first Camper Van Beethoven album not to feature founding guitarist/drummer/multi-instrumentalist Chris Molla.

The album featured the band's trademark eclectic mix of musics, including folk, ska, Eastern European music, Americana, psychedelic rock, and Middle-Eastern music.  Despite this, it has a considerably slicker and more mainstream sound than the band's previous, more garage-rock oriented albums, largely due to Herring's production. The reunited Camper Van Beethoven features a number of tracks from the album in its setlists, including most of the first side, as well as "Waka", "Tania", and "Life Is Grand" from the second side.

Lowery described the inclusion of the folk song "O Death" as a tribute to the American 1960s psychedelic band Kaleidoscope, who included their version of the song on their album Side Trips.

Track listing

On the reissue, tracks 15-17 are from the "Life Is Grand" single, track 18 is from the "Eye of Fatima"/"Turquoise Jewelry" promo single, and track 25 is from the 1987 compilation At Dianne's Place. Tracks 20-24 were recorded October 14, 1988 at UMass Amherst, Amherst, MA; they and track 19 were previously unreleased.

References

Camper Van Beethoven albums
1988 albums
Virgin Records albums
Albums produced by Dennis Herring